Jalikan may refer to:
 Jalikan-e Olya
 Jalikan-e Sofla